Hutch Stirs 'em Up is a 1923 British silent comedy action film directed by Frank Hall Crane and starring Charles Hutchison, Joan Barry and Malcolm Tod. It was based on the novel The Hawk of Rede by Harry Harding.

Cast
 Charles Hutchison - Hurricane Hutch
 Joan Barry - Joan
 Malcolm Tod - Tom Grey
 Gibson Gowland - Sir Arthur Blackross
 Sunday Wilshin - Mrs. Grey
 Aubrey Fitzgerald - Crudelas
 Violet Forbes - Mrs. Cruddas

References

External links
 

}

1923 films
British action comedy films
British silent feature films
Films directed by Frank Hall Crane
1920s action comedy films
Films based on British novels
Ideal Film Company films
British black-and-white films
1923 comedy films
1920s English-language films
1920s British films
Silent action comedy films